Iturraspe is a surname. Notable people with the surname include:

Ander Iturraspe (born 1989), Spanish footballer
Carlos Iturraspe (1910–1981), Spanish footballer and manager
Gorka Iturraspe (born 1994), Spanish footballer, brother of Ander
Lourdes Pérez Iturraspe (born 2000), Argentinian field hockey player